Katherine Stanhope, Countess of Chesterfield (1609–1667) was an English courtier who was the governess and confidante of Mary, Princess Royal and Princess of Orange, and the first woman to hold the office of Postmaster General of England.

Origins
She was the elder daughter of Thomas Wotton, 2nd Baron Wotton, by his wife Mary Throckmorton, a daughter of Sir Arthur Throckmorton of Paulerspury, Northamptonshire.

Career
After the marriage of William and Mary in May 1641, she followed her husband to Holland as the governess to the Princess Royal. As the princess came to age, Lady Stanhope grew to become her confidante and adviser. During the English Civil War, Lady Stanhope sided with Charles I and his heir, King Charles II; she is said to have supplied them both politically and financially, and to have been involved in much of the royalist plots of that decade. After the death of Heenvliet in 1660, Charles II created her Countess of Chesterfield in recognition of both her service and her friendship. She remained in princess Mary's service until the latter's death from illness on 24 December 1660. She then passed into the service of Anne Hyde, Duchess of York, and in 1662 to Queen Catherine of Braganza, wife of Charles II. In 1662 Lady Catherine married her friend Daniel O'Neill (d.1664), Postmaster General, another one of the King's men during the civil war. Upon his death in 1664, she increased her by then already considerable wealth by inheriting O'Neill's office of Postmaster General.

Marriages and progeny
She married three times:
Firstly in 1628 to Henry Stanhope, Lord Stanhope (d.1634), 2nd surviving son of Philip Stanhope, 1st Earl of Chesterfield, by whom she had progeny two daughters and a son:
Philip Stanhope, 2nd Earl of Chesterfield, who in 1656 inherited the Earldom of Chesterfield from his grandfather.
Mary Stanhope
Catherine Stanhope
Secondly in early 1641, after being courted by several suitors, she married the Dutchman Jehan van der Kerckhove, Lord of Heenvliet (d.1660), one of the diplomats involved in negotiating the marriage between William II, Prince of Orange and Mary, the Princess Royal, daughter of King Charles I, future parents of King William III of England.
Thirdly in 1662 to Daniel O'Neill (d.1664), Postmaster General, a Royalist during the civil war.

Death
She died of an edema in 1667, and was buried on her father's estate.

Notes

References

Attribution
 

Daughters of barons
Wives of knights
United Kingdom Postmasters General
1609 births
1667 deaths
English countesses
Life peeresses created by Charles II
Stanhope
Deaths from edema
People from Boughton Malherbe
Katherine
17th-century English nobility
Women government ministers in the United Kingdom
Governesses to the British Royal Household
Ladies of the Bedchamber
Court of Charles II of England
Household of Catherine of Braganza